Henk Hulzebos (born 11 April 1950) is an Austrian equestrian. He competed in two events at the 1976 Summer Olympics.

References

1950 births
Living people
Austrian male equestrians
Olympic equestrians of Austria
Equestrians at the 1976 Summer Olympics
Sportspeople from Drenthe